A list of films produced in Pakistan in 1957 (see 1957 in film) and in the Urdu language:

1957

See also
 1957 in Pakistan

References

External links
 Search Pakistani film - IMDB.com

1957
Lists of 1957 films by country or language
Films